The Patron's Trophy was a cricket competition that was held in Pakistan between 1960–61 and 2018–19 mainly among teams representing the government and semi-government departments, corporations, commercial organisations, business houses, banks, airlines, and educational institutions.

Matches in the competition were afforded first-class status in most seasons until 2006–07, when the domestic first-class competition was reorganised and merged into the Quaid-e-Azam Trophy by the Pakistan Cricket Board (PCB). From then on, the Patron's Trophy was a Grade II competition until a major reorganisation of domestic cricket in 2019 brought an end to the competition.

For the 2012–13 domestic season a new first-class competition, called the President's Trophy Grade I, was created for departments. It was announced as a renaming of the Patron's Trophy, and ran for just two seasons before the PCB merged the regions and departments back into a reorganised Quaid-i-Azam Trophy for the 2014–15 season.

History
The competition was founded in 1960–61 as the Ayub Trophy, named after then President of Pakistan, Ayub Khan. In 1970–71 the competition was renamed the BCCP Trophy, and two years later it received the title BCCP Patron's Trophy, recognising its purpose as a competition for departmental teams, as opposed to the Quaid-i-Azam Trophy, which was primarily contested by teams from regional associations. A year later, in 1973–74, the Pentangular Trophy was introduced, contested by the leading teams from both competitions.

The Patron's Trophy has most often been contested by all departmental teams, but has been a mixed competition with regional associations and even all associations. Matches in the competition were afforded the first-class status until 2006–07 with the exception of between 1979 and 1983, and the 1999–2000 season. When it has not been a first-class competition, the Patron's Trophy has commonly acted as a qualifying competition for the Quaid-i-Azam Trophy by means of promotion and relegation.

Winners

References

 
Pakistani domestic cricket competitions
Recurring sporting events established in 1960
Recurring sporting events disestablished in 2019
Sports leagues established in 1960
Sports leagues disestablished in 2019
1960 establishments in Pakistan
2019 disestablishments in Pakistan
First-class cricket competitions
Defunct cricket competitions